Hardin Burnley (March 19, 1761March 11, 1809) was a Virginia lawyer and political figure who served in the Virginia House of Delegates and the Virginia Council of State.  As President of the Council, Burnley was the acting Governor of Virginia for three days in 1799, pending the swearing in of James Monroe.

References

1761 births
1809 deaths
Members of the Virginia House of Delegates